The Birmingham Statistical Society was a society active in Birmingham, England in the 1830s and 1840s. It was also known as the "Birmingham Statistical Society for the Improvement of Education".

In 1839, the Society produced "a very accurate enquiry into the state of education in that town... ; when it was found that the schools of all kinds, public, private, day, Sunday..."

The Society was still active as of 1887.

References 

Organisations based in Birmingham, West Midlands
Clubs and societies in the West Midlands (county)